Giles of Orval was a Cistercian monk and historian. Originally from the prince-bishopric of Liège, he lived and worked in the abbey of Orval in the archdiocese of Trier. His major work was the Gesta episcoporum Leodiensium he compiled between 1247 and 1251. It is a history of his native diocese and its bishops from 1048 until his own time. At the same time he also composed a shorter version, the Gesta episcoporum Leodensium abbreviata. As a historian, Giles was rather uncritical with his sources, the most important of which were Heriger of Lobbes and Anselm of Liège.

Notes

Sources

Historians of the Catholic Church
13th-century Latin writers
13th-century historians from the Holy Roman Empire
Prince-Bishopric of Liège clergy
Belgian Cistercians